Kingswood College may refer to:
 Kingswood College (Box Hill), Victoria, Australia
 Kingswood College (Doncaster), Victoria, Australia
 Kingswood College (South Africa)
 Kingswood College (Sri Lanka)
 The former name of Scarisbrick Hall School, Lancashire, England
 A Kingswood College existed in Kingswood, Kentucky from 1906 to 1934

See also
Kingswood School (disambiguation)
Kingswood Academy (disambiguation)
Kingswood (disambiguation)